Crimson Dawn may refer to:

Places

Fictional locations
 Crimson Dawn (fictional location) a fictional realm in the Marvel Comics Universe

People

Fictional characters
 Crimson Dawn (character), a fictional character in the DC Comics Universe, see List of Secret Six members

Literature
 The Crimson Dawn (novel) a 1957 novel by Abul Fazal
 Crimson Dawn (short story) a 1995 Doctor Who story by Tim Robins published in Decalog 2: Lost Property, see Virgin Decalog
 Psylocke & Archangel: Crimson Dawn (comic book) a 1997 Marvel Comics limited series, see List of X-Men limited series and one-shots

Other uses
 Crimson Dawn (fictional organization) a fictional crime syndicate led by Darth Maul in the Star Wars universe
 "Crimson Dawn" (song) a 2008 single by Seth Lakeman
 Crimson Dawn (band), a fictional band featured in the South Park episode "Band in China"

See also
 Land of the Crimson Dawn, a power metal album by Freedom Call
 Red Sky at Morning (disambiguation)
 Red Dawn (disambiguation)
 Krasnaya Zarya (disambiguation), Russian for "Crimson Dawn"